Josh Williams (born 12 June 1998) is a former professional Australian rules footballer who played for the North Melbourne Football Club in the Australian Football League (AFL). He was drafted by North Melbourne with their third selection and thirty-sixth overall in the 2016 national draft. He was delisted at the end of the 2018 season.

For 2019-20 he played for the Southport Sharks in the North East Australian Football League which later merged with the Victorian Football League from 2021 onwards.

References

External links

1998 births
Living people
North Melbourne Football Club players
Werribee Football Club players
Southport Australian Football Club players
Australian rules footballers from Queensland